Okehampton Argyle Football Club is a football club based in Okehampton, England.

History
Okehampton Argyle were formed in 1926 by a group of railway workers in Okehampton. In 1929, the club joined the West Devon League. In 1932, Okehampton entered the Exeter and District League. In 1993, after 61 years in the Devon and Exeter League, the club joined the South Western League for a three year stint, before moving back to the Devon and Exeter League. In 2007, the club joined the South West Peninsula League. In 2020, Okehampton joined the Devon League South & West Division for a single season. In 2021, the club was admitted into the South West Peninsula League Premier Division East.

Ground
The club currently play at Simmons Park in Okehampton. Before moving to the site, Okehampton played at North Road in the town.

References

Okehampton
Association football clubs established in 1926
1926 establishments in England
Football clubs in England
Football clubs in Devon
Devon and Exeter Football League
South Western Football League
South West Peninsula League
Devon Football League